Darts Mills is a historic unincorporated community located within Readington Township in Hunterdon County, New Jersey, United States. It is located on the South Branch of the Raritan River, and several mills were built there in the early 18th century. At its height, a merchant, blacksmith, store and complex of mills were here. The last mill at this site burnt down in 1994.  Foundation walls and a mill race remain at the site today.  On April 29, 1982, Dart's Mill was added to the National Register of Historic Places.

References

Unincorporated communities in Readington Township, New Jersey
Unincorporated communities in Hunterdon County, New Jersey
Unincorporated communities in New Jersey
Historic districts on the National Register of Historic Places in New Jersey
National Register of Historic Places in Hunterdon County, New Jersey
New Jersey Register of Historic Places